The 2015 Bangladesh Premier League Final was a day/night Twenty20 cricket match played between the Barisal Bulls and the Comilla Victorians on 15 December 2015 at the Sher-e-Bangla National Cricket Stadium, Dhaka to determine the winner of the 2015 Bangladesh Premier League, a professional Twenty20 cricket league in Bangladesh. It ended as the Victorians defeated the Bulls by three wickets.

The Victorians, captained by Mashrafe Mortaza, topped the group stage table, whereas the Bulls, led by Mahmudullah, stood at the third position. Victorians beat Rangpur Riders in the Qualifier 1 and went to final. Bulls defeated Dhaka Dynamites and Rangpur Riders respectively in Eliminator and Qualifier 2 of semi-finals and went to final. The match telecasted on Channel 9.

The total attendance of the match was 25500.(Reference from BCB). Winning the toss, Victorians' captain Mashrafe Mortaza elected to field first. The Bulls scored 156 runs in 20 overs with a loss of 4 wickets. Batting at number five, Mahmudullah top scored for the Bulls with 48 runs. Victorians' bowler Darren Stevens took one wickets with 6.33	economy rate. The Bulls scored 23 in the opening partnership. However, due to contributions from the middle order, it reached the winning total in the last ball and earned the 2015 Bangladesh Premier League title. Kapali, who was the best performer for the Victorians with bat, was named the man of the match.

Route to final

Comilla was ranked first on the league table, though Barisal was ranked third in the group stage, as per NRR. Both team won seven, and lost three matches. Comilla won the qualifier 1 match and grabbed the final. Barisal won the eliminator and qualifier 2 one after one, booking their place in the final.

Group stage

Note: The points at the end of each group match are listed.
Note: Click on the points to see the summary for the match.

Play-off

Semifinal

References

External links

Premier League Final
Final
Premier League Final